Maruti Temple of Shirsada village, also known as Shirsada's Hanuman Temple, is a Hindu temple located in the village of Shirsada in Bodwad taluka in Maharashtra's Jalgaon district. Its deity is Hanuman.

Overview 
According to a legend associated with the temple, in longtime ago, villagers discovered Maruti's stone idol in the nearby river. They took the idol to a neem tree and performed the rite of Prana Pratishtha to consecrate it.

The Mandira is unique in the sense that it does not have a Shikhar, Amlak, and Kadas. Several other temples are located in the temple premises.

Maruti Temple is situated 7.45 miles away from the town of Muktainagar and 46 Miles from Jalgaon.

References 

Hindu temples in Maharashtra 
Hanuman temples
Tourist attractions in Jalgaon district